A los héroes del dos de mayo or Al pueblo del dos de mayo de 1808 is an instance of public art in Madrid, Spain. A sculptural work by Aniceto Marinas, the monument is an homage to the role of the Madrilenian people during the 1808 Dos de mayo uprising.

History and description 
Originally sculpted in Rome by Aniceto Marinas in 1891, the sculptural group depicts a winged statue holding a banner that emerges on top of a soldier, a cannon, a small boy and a number of corpses, male and female alike.

There was no time to cast the bronze for the inauguration, and instead the plaster model of the sculptural group was installed, secretly disguised by a greenish paint, which soon faded after the rains, to the surprise of the Madrilenian people. In October 1908, the bronze statue, cast in Madrid by "La Metaloplástica. Campins y Codina" foundry, was put on the pedestal.

The cylindrical stone pedestal features an inscription reading  "" ("to the People of the 2 May 1808"), surmounted by a bronze rendition of the municipal coat of arms.

References 
Information notes

Citations

Bibliography
 
 
Monuments and memorials in Madrid
Outdoor sculptures in Madrid
Statues in Spain
Buildings and structures in Argüelles neighborhood, Madrid
Bronze sculptures in Spain
Peninsular War monuments and memorials